St Augustine's, Whitton, on Hospital Bridge Road in Whitton in the London Borough of Richmond upon Thames,  is a Church of England church in the Diocese of London. Its minister is The Revd Canon John Kafwanka K.

History
The church was founded in 1935 and met, until 1958, at Bishop Perrin's School.

References

External links
 Official website

1935 establishments in England
20th-century Church of England church buildings
Christian organizations established in 1935
Whitton
Churches completed in 1958
Churches in Whitton, London
Diocese of London